Charles Baring (1807–1879) was an English bishop of Durham.

Charles Baring may also refer to:

Sir Charles Baring, 2nd Baronet (1898–1990) of the Baring baronets
Charles Baring, 2nd Baron Howick of Glendale (born 1937)
Charles Baring of Baring family properties

See also
Charles Edward Baring Young (1850–1928), English educationalist and Conservative politician